is a 1974 Japanese kaiju film directed by Jun Fukuda, with special effects by Teruyoshi Nakano. Distributed by Toho and produced under their effects subsidiary Toho–Eizo, it is the 14th film of the Godzilla franchise, and features the fictional monster characters Godzilla, Anguirus, and King Caesar, along with the mecha character Mechagodzilla. The film stars Masaaki Daimon, Kazuya Aoyama, Gorō Mutsumi, and Akihiko Hirata, with Isao Zushi as Godzilla, Satoru Kuzumi as both Anguirus and King Caesar, and Kazunari Mori as Mechagodzilla. The film marks the first appearances of King Caesar and Mechagodzilla in the franchise.

Godzilla vs. Mechagodzilla was released theatrically in Japan on March 21, 1974. The film received a limited release in the United States in 1977 by Cinema Shares, under the title Godzilla vs. the Bionic Monster. It was then quickly re-released under the title Godzilla vs. the Cosmic Monster which was also the UK theatrical title. The film was followed up with a direct sequel in 1975 titled Terror of Mechagodzilla.

Plot
In Okinawa, an Azumi priestess has a vision of a city being destroyed by a giant monster. Meanwhile, Masahiko Shimizu discovers a type of metal not found on Earth while spelunking and takes it to Professor Miyajima for examination. An excavation led by Masahiko's brother Keisuke uncovers a chamber filled with ancient artifacts and a mural bearing an ominous prophecy: "When a black mountain appears above the clouds, a huge monster will arise and try to destroy the world; but when the red moon sets and the sun rises in the west, two monsters shall appear to save the people." Keisuke is joined by archaeologist Saeko Kaneshiro, who translates the prophecy and takes a statue bearing the likeness of Okinawa's guardian monster King Caesar to study. Two men stalk them, with one claiming to be a reporter while the other attempts to steal the statue, but fails and flees.

Following the appearance of a black cloud resembling a mountain, Godzilla emerges from Mount Fuji and begins a destructive rampage despite having become tolerant of humans within the past years. Godzilla's ally, Anguirus, confronts it, only to be nearly killed and forced to retreat. Keisuke arrives shortly after to check on Masahiko and Miyajima. Godzilla's rampage continues until the real Godzilla emerges to fight it, exposing it an imposter called Mechagodzilla, a massive robot armed with advanced weaponry made of the same strange metal, later revealed to be space titanium. Godzilla is severely wounded, but inflicts some damage on Mechagodzilla before both monsters retreat. Miyajima hypothesizes, based on Mechagodzilla's advanced technology and composition, that the robot is an alien superweapon.

Keisuke and Saeko take the statue back to the temple, but are confronted by the thief once again. During the fight, the skin on half of the stranger's face melts away, revealing an ape-like visage. The intruder attempts to kill Keisuke, but an unseen gunman kills him before Keisuke and Saeko catch a brief glimpse of the reporter. Concurrently, Godzilla arrives on Monster Island during a thunderstorm and is struck by lightning multiple times, reinvigorating itself.

Masahiko, Miyajima and his daughter Ikuko explore the cave where the space titanium was first found, but are captured by ape-like aliens from the Third Planet of the Black Hole, who plan to use Mechagodzilla to conquer Earth. Their leader, Kuronuma, forces Miyajima to repair the robot. While Saeko checks into a hotel and guards the statue, Keisuke leaves to meet Masahiko at the caves, only to encounter the reporter, who reveals himself as Nanbara, an Interpol agent who has been tracking the aliens. After Nanbara and Keisuke infiltrate the alien base and free the prisoners, Keisuke and Ikuko leave to pick up Saeko and the statue while Miyajima, Nanbara, and Masahiko stay behind, only to be recaptured by Kuronuma.

The next morning, a lunar eclipse results in a red moon and a mirage of the sun rising in the west. Seeing this, the team realizes they have to awaken King Caesar. They meet with the priestess and her grandfather and place the statue in the temple, revealing King Caesar's resting place. As Kuronuma dispatches Mechagodzilla, the priestess sings to awaken King Caesar and Godzilla appears shortly afterward. The two monsters join forces to fight Mechagodzilla. When the robot tries to escape, Godzilla uses its stored electricity to create an electromagnetic field to attract Mechagodzilla before tearing off its head; causing it to explode. While the mortified aliens are distracted, Nanbara and the others free themselves, kill their captors, and sabotage the base, fleeing as it explodes. With the enemy defeated, Godzilla heads out to sea and King Caesar returns to its resting place while the humans rejoice.

Cast

Release
  Godzilla vs. Mechagodzilla was released in Japan on March 21, 1974, where it was distributed by Toho. The film was followed up with a direct sequel in 1975 titled Terror of Mechagodzilla.

The film was released in the United States in March 1977. It was released by Cinema Shares in the United States under the title Godzilla vs. the Bionic Monster where the film was shown predominantly at Saturday "kiddie" matinees. The Cinema Shares theatrical version deleted four minutes of credits, profanity and blood-letting from the film. Universal Television threatened to sue Cinema Shares over the use of the name "Bionic" in the film's title, as they owned the rights to The Six Million Dollar Man and The Bionic Woman TV series. The film title was quickly changed to Godzilla vs. the Cosmic Monster, which was also used for the 1977 U.K. theatrical release.

Box office
The film made slightly more money than Godzilla vs. Megalon, but was still not making as big a box office profit as the other films in the Godzilla series had in the early 1960s.

Home video
In 1988, New World Video restored the film on home video, using a complete and unedited print titled Godzilla vs. Mechagodzilla. 
In 2004, TriStar released the film on DVD as Godzilla vs. Mechagodzilla, with both English and Japanese audio included. In 2019, both the Japanese version and export English version were included in a Blu-ray box set released by the Criterion Collection, which included all 15 films from the franchise's Shōwa era.

Reception 
In a contemporary review in the Monthly Film Bulletin, Tony Rayns stated that at this point in the Godzilla series, there was no way the film "could have been anything other than formulary, but it could clearly have been much less shambling than it is." Rayns noted that Shinichi Sekizawa's story was "for once, quite ambitious" while noting that the film's "'mythic' elements are never coherent or impressive enough to match the array of alien technology, and the script seems to forget all about fulfilling its own prophecies as it hurries towards the regulation free-style wrestling climax."

From retrospective reviews, Stuart Galbraith IV discussed the film in his book on Japanese genre films. Galbraith described the film as a "complete mess", finding that the aliens in the film were a rip-off of Planet of the Apes and that the film had poor effects work and "equally poor direction of Jun Fukuda." Galbraith opined that the film was "an improvement over Godzilla vs. Megalon, but that's not saying much."  Among the positive attributes, Galbraith noted that Masaru Sato's score was interesting and series veterans Akihiko Hirata, Hiroshi Koizumi and Kenji Sahara "make welcome appearances." In Phil Hardy's book Science Fiction (1984), a review stated that "the final fight is suitably impressive although the tongue-in-cheek reference to Leone slows the action down too much."

See also

 List of Japanese films of 1974
 List of science fiction films of the 1970s

References 

Bibliography

External links

 Godzilla on the web (Japan)
 
 
 
 
 

1974 films
1970s Japanese-language films
1970s fantasy films
1970s science fiction films
Alien invasions in films
Films about extraterrestrial life
Films scored by Masaru Sato
Films directed by Jun Fukuda
Films produced by Tomoyuki Tanaka
Films set in Okinawa Prefecture
Films set in Shizuoka Prefecture
Films set in Tokyo
Giant monster films
Godzilla films
Japanese science fiction films
Japanese sequel films
Kaiju films
1970s monster movies
Natural horror films
Toho films
Mecha films
Films with screenplays by Shinichi Sekizawa
Apes in popular culture
1970s Japanese films
Films about princesses